Mark McQueen (born 9 January 1970) is a former Australian rules footballer who played with Richmond in the Australian Football League (AFL).
McQueen started his career at Sandy Bay in the Tasmanian Football League between 1986-87.

McQueen, a defender, won the best and fairest award at Tasmanian Football League (TFL) club North Hobart in 1988 and 1990.

In the 1990 AFL National Draft, McQueen was selected by Richmond, with pick 42. After making his senior debut in 1991, McQueen was a regular fixture in the senior team in 1992 AFL season, when he played 18 games.

After his delistment from Richmond, McQueen transferred to South Australian National Football League (SANFL) club Woodville-West Torrens.

References

External links
 
 

1970 births
Australian rules footballers from Tasmania
Richmond Football Club players
North Hobart Football Club players
Woodville-West Torrens Football Club players
Sandy Bay Football Club players
Living people